One of a Kind is the first extended play of South Korean singer-songwriter and rapper G-Dragon. It was released on September 15, 2012, digitally, and September 18 physically, through YG Entertainment. The EP consists of seven songs all written or co-written, and co-composed by G-Dragon himself.

Upon release, the album was a commercial success in South Korea. It peaked atop the Gaon Albums Chart and on the Billboard World Albums Chart. The EP also entered the Billboard 200 peaking at number 161, making G-Dragon the first Korean soloist with a Korean-language album to enter that chart. As of 2017, the album has sold over 260,000 copies in his native country, making it the highest selling album by a Korean soloist since the release of his debut album Heartbreaker (2009).

Release and promotion
The lead single from the EP, "One of a Kind", was released on August 24. "That XX" and "Crayon" were later released as second and third singles off the EP. Originally, the song "Without You" had a featuring first credited as "? from YG New Girl Group", when it was first announced that YG was starting a new girl group. Almost four years after the EP was released, the featuring vocals were revealed to be Rosé from said new girl group, Blackpink.

G-Dragon held a live-stream to countdown to and celebrate the release of the EP through Naver's Line TV, with guests Lydia Paek, Taeyang, producer Choice37, and rapper-producer Tablo of Epik High.

G-Dragon embarked on his first world tour, the One of a Kind World Tour, in support of the EP which marked the first time for a Korean soloist to hold a Japanese dome-arena tour. Many of his YG label-mates made special guest appearances on various stops throughout the tour, including his bandmates Big Bang, as well as 2NE1, Tablo, Lee Hi, and Akdong Musician. The tour began on March 30 and concluded on September 1, 2013, at Olympic Gymnastics Arena in Seoul, South Korea.

Critical reception
Allmusic reviewer David Jeffries gave the album 3.5 out of 5 stars, remarking while "few others would have the daring or money for his flashy wardrobe, [G-Dragon] deserves that swagger due to his talent as well". Jeffries complimented the production in the tracks "One of a Kind" and "Crayon", and compared the record to Lady Gaga's music, writing that the rapper took his "'little monster" attitude and did "some envelope pushing" with the EP. Korean online magazine IZM included One of a Kind in their list of best albums of 2012, highlighting the variety of genres heard in the album, which included rock, hip hop and acoustic. IZM complimented G-Dragon's artistic direction and felt that the album brought the "recovery of swag and madness."

Commercial performance
One of a Kind charted at number one on the Gaon Album Chart and became the best selling album of September, with 171,512 copies sold. By the end of the year the EP had sold 204,326 copies, becoming the fourth best-selling album of 2012. In 2013, the album sold additional 45,332 copies, and was the 43rd best selling album of the year. In Taiwan, the album went platinum with over 10,000 copies sold. In the United States, the album entered the Billboard 200 at number 161, making G-Dragon the fourth Korean artist to enter the chart. One of a Kind also topped the Billboard World Albums chart and peaked at number six on the Heatseekers chart.

With only one day of sales, the songs from the album sold over 1 million digital copies combined, and on the second week the songs sold 1.7 million copies. As of August 2016, the album and its songs has sold over 8.2 million copies.

Accolades

Track listing

Charts

Weekly charts

Monthly charts

Year-end charts

Sales and certifications

Release history

References

External links
 Official Website

G-Dragon albums
2012 EPs
YG Entertainment EPs
Korean-language EPs
Albums produced by G-Dragon
Albums produced by Teddy Park